Mohammad Zohari (1926–1995) was an Iranian poet and writer.

He was born in Tonekabon, a city in northern Iran. He was the first son of Abdollah Khaan Zohari Khalatbari, an activist in the Iranian Constitutional Revolution who had received the honorific title of "Motamed-ol-Soltan Zaigham-ol-Mamalek" from Ahmad Shah Qajar. In 1931, due to his father's disagreement with Reza Shah Pahlavi, the family was exiled to Malayer, and later to Shiraz. There he started his writing career in his early teenage years by writing articles and short stories for Toffan Magazine. After the end of the Second World War, the family returned to Tehran. There, Zohari studied Persian literature at Tehran University, and later achieved a PhD in literature from the same university. After graduation, Zohari worked as high school and university teacher, and as a journalist for Ferdowsi Magazine, Fokahi and some others for some years before he became a government employee and worked in various positions such as head of media and PR for the Ministry of Education and vice-director of the National Library of Iran.

In his work, Zohari found inspiration in all his surroundings, and most of his poems were about his social environment or love, however the most published one was about the country's social circumstances. In 1953, he met Nima Yooshij for the first time, which resulted in many more visits in the following years, to discuss poetry and modern literature that many believe influenced Zohari's work and modern poetry in Iran.

In 1977, Zohari travelled to Paris and stayed until 1979, when he returned to Iran, however due to some of his socialistic thought in 1982, three years after the Iranian Revolution, he was again forced to leave Iran and moved to Paris. The experience to leave his home by force for the second time, once when he was a child and once as an adult, was very difficult for Zohari, and caused his decision to do not write anymore. Due to his enormous love for Iran, Zohari returned to Tehran in 1992, but during some legal straggling he died of a heart attack in 1995.

Published poetry collections
The Island, (1955) Amirkabir (publisher)
The Complaint, (1966) Publisher: Ashrafe
Nocturnal Letter, (شبنامه) (1968) Publisher: Ashrafe
And the End, (1969)
Fist in the Pocket, (1972) Publisher: Ashrafe
Our Old Sage Said, (1977) Publisher: Ravag
For every star (برای هر ستاره), (2000) Publisher: Toos
 A short biography and collection of some unpublished Zohari’s work, collected by his wife Mandana Bavandi Zohari, controlled by Bahman Hamidi and published by Mohsin Bagherzadeh. The title of book was suggested by Dr Shafiee kadkani and the cover were designed by Ali Zaym.

See also

Intellectual movements in Iran

Footnotes

Sources

External links 
 Selected work online in English
 Shabnameh (Persian) (download)
 Mosht dar Jib (Persian (download)

1926 births
1995 deaths
Persian-language poets
20th-century Iranian poets
People from Tonekabon
Faculty of Letters and Humanities of the University of Tehran alumni